Staffan Danielsson (born 29 Juni 1947) is a Swedish Christian Democratic politician, who was a member of the Riksdag in 2004–2014 as well as 2015–2018 for the Centre Party. In 2021 he joined the Christian Democrats.

References

1947 births
21st-century Swedish politicians
Living people
Members of the Riksdag from the Centre Party (Sweden)
Members of the Riksdag 2002–2006
Members of the Riksdag 2006–2010
Members of the Riksdag 2010–2014
Members of the Riksdag 2014–2018